Ralph R. Harding (September 9, 1929 – October 26, 2006) was a former congressman from eastern Idaho; he served two terms as a Democrat from 1961 to 1965.

Early life
Born in Malad City, Idaho, Harding served as a missionary for the Church of Jesus Christ of Latter-day Saints for two years. He graduated from Brigham Young University in Provo, Utah in 1956, after serving in Korea from 1951 to 1953 in the U.S. Army, where he rose to the rank of lieutenant.

Career
Harding served in the Idaho state legislature from 1955 to 1956. He ran against Republican congressman Hamer Budge, a ten-year incumbent in Idaho's 2nd district in 1960. Harding pulled off an upset victory with 51.1 percent, winning by 4,000 votes. He was re-elected in 1962, but was one of the few incumbent Democrats in the U.S. House who lost to Republican challengers even as President Lyndon B. Johnson won in a landslide in 1964. Many attribute Harding's loss to a speech he made in the U.S. House of Representatives for criticizing LDS Apostle Ezra Taft Benson for being a "spokesman for the radical right of this nation"; Harding's congressional district was home to a large LDS population.

Benson was Secretary of Agriculture for two terms during the Eisenhower administration. After he left the Department of Agriculture, Benson vigorously supported the views of John Birch Society founder Robert Welch. In his book "The Patriot" Welch called Eisenhower a communist sympathizer. In a letter, Eisenhower thanked Harding for defending him against Welch's allegations.

After his 1964 defeat, Harding served as special assistant to the Secretary of the Air Force. In 1966, Harding won the Democratic nomination for the U.S. Senate, but was defeated by Republican incumbent Len Jordan in the general election.

Harding attempted to regain the 2nd district seat again in 1978, but lost the Democratic primary to Stan Kress. He then worked on a variety of business ventures, including representing the Philippine sugar industry and attempting to launch an Asian version of the NBA.

Death and legacy
Harding died at the age of seventy-seven in Blackfoot. According to a news report in the Idaho Statesman, a cause of death was not released by the hospital or family at the time of his death. He is interred at Malad City Cemetery in Malad City.

Harding was an active member of the Church of Jesus Christ of Latter-day Saints.

Harding and baseball hall of famer Harmon Killebrew of Payette co-founded the Killebrew-Thompson Memorial, formerly the Danny Thompson Memorial Golf Tournament, in 1977. The tournament is held annually in Sun Valley in late August to benefit leukemia and cancer research at St. Luke's Mountain States Tumor Institute in Idaho and Masonic Cancer Center, University of Minnesota.

References

External links 
 
 UCSF Library – Harding biography, circa 1981, on Killebrew & Harding stationery
 Killebrew-Thompson Memorial Golf Tournament 

Political Graveyard – Ralph Harding
Our Campaigns – Ralph R. Harding

1929 births
2006 deaths
Latter Day Saints from Idaho
Brigham Young University alumni
Democratic Party members of the United States House of Representatives from Idaho
People from Malad City, Idaho
People from Blackfoot, Idaho
20th-century American politicians